Djebelemuridae is an extinct family of early strepsirrhine primates from Africa. It consists of five genera. The organisms in this family were exceptionally small, and were insectivores. This family dates to the early to late Eocene. Although they gave rise to the crown strepsirrhines, which includes today's lemurs and lorisoids, they lacked the toothcomb that identifies that group.

Notes

References

Literature cited 

 
 
 

Prehistoric strepsirrhines
Eocene primates
Prehistoric mammals of Africa
Prehistoric mammal families
Primate families